"Dead Ringer for Love" is a song performed by American rock singer Meat Loaf and American singer-actress Cher from Meat Loaf's second studio album, Dead Ringer. The song was written by Jim Steinman and one of only two tracks on the album produced by Steinman and Jimmy Iovine.

Song information
The song was originally written by Jim Steinman, Tony Hendra and Sean Kelly (and sung by Michael Simmons) for the short-lived television comedy series, Delta House. Steinman reworked the melody into the song "Dead Ringer for Love" for the Dead Ringer album, while portions of the lyrics would later appear in his "Tonight Is What It Means to Be Young". Cher also helped write the song, but she remains uncredited.

The song was performed live many times by Meat Loaf but never by Cher. There is no footage of Cher and Meat Loaf ever performing this song live together, and Cher appeared only in the music video. The song performed by Meat Loaf is available in two live CDs: Live Around the World and Bat out of Hell: Live with the Melbourne Symphony Orchestra. The song was also used in Meat Loaf's Hits out of Hell and on some Bat Out of Hell re-releases and in Cher's Greatest Hits: 1965–1992 compilations, as well as Cher's album Essential Collection.

The track was released in the United Kingdom in November 1981 and debuted at number 63 on the UK Singles Chart. It slowly climbed the chart and peaked at number five in early February 1982.

Allmusic editor William Ruhlmann later highlighted the song. Also, Donald A. Guarisco retrospectively praised the lyrics: "The tongue-in-cheek lyrics tell the tale of a guy who’s realized he cant 'live by rock ‘n’ roll and brew alone' and sets his sights on his ideal woman (...) The lyric devotes equal time to his vampy object of affection". He added that, "This unique blend of vocal and instrumental firepower makes 'Dead Ringer For Love' feel like a long-lost outtake from the Grease soundtrack on steroids."

Charts and certifications

Weekly charts

Year-end charts

Certifications and sales

References

1981 songs
Meat Loaf songs
Cher songs
Songs written by Jim Steinman
1981 singles
Epic Records singles
Song recordings produced by Jim Steinman
Song recordings produced by Jimmy Iovine
Male–female vocal duets
Song recordings with Wall of Sound arrangements